Harry Clifford Canfield (November 22, 1875 – February 9, 1945) was an American educator, businessman, and politician who served five terms as a U.S. Representative from Indiana from 1923 to 1933.

Early life and career 
Born near Moores Hill, Indiana, Canfield attended the public schools, Moores Hill College, Central Normal College, Danville, Indiana, and Vorhies Business College, Indianapolis, Indiana. He taught school in Dearborn County 1896-1898.
He moved to Batesville, Ripley County, in 1899 and engaged in the manufacture of furniture. He was also interested in the jobbing of furniture, and in farming and banking.

Congress 
Canfield was elected as a Democrat to the Sixty-eighth and to the four succeeding Congresses (March 4, 1923 – March 3, 1933).
He was an unsuccessful candidate for renomination in 1932.

Later career and death 
He resumed the furniture manufacturing business in Batesville, Indiana, where he died February 9, 1945.
He was interred in the First Methodist Episcopal Cemetery.

References

External links
 

1875 births
1945 deaths
People from Batesville, Indiana
Democratic Party members of the United States House of Representatives from Indiana
People from Dearborn County, Indiana
People from Danville, Indiana
Educators from Indiana
Businesspeople from Indiana
20th-century American businesspeople
Furniture manufacturers